Christos Pipinis (born 1 November 1984) is a Greek professional footballer who lastly played for Apollon Smyrni in the Superleague Greece, as a left defender.

Career

Greece
Born in Athens, Pipinis began playing football with local side Akratitos. He moved on to Veria, Panserraikos and Thrasyvoulos before joining Asteras Tripoli on a free transfer in June 2010.

APOEL
On 1 January 2014, aged 29, Pipinis moved abroad for the first time and signed an 18-month contract with Cypriot club APOEL. He made his debut on 4 January 2014, coming on as a 74th-minute substitute in APOEL's 2–2 home draw against AEL Limassol for the Cypriot First Division and scored his first official goal on 9 April 2014, in his team's 4–0 away win against Doxa Katokopias for the quarter-finals of the Cypriot Cup. Pipinis won his first ever career title, after APOEL won Ermis Aradippou 2–0 in the Cypriot Cup final and lifted the trophy. Ten days later, Pipinis won also the Cypriot First Division after APOEL's 1–0 away victory against AEL Limassol in the title deciding match of the competition. On 1 June 2014, APOEL terminated Pipinis' contract with the club by mutual consent. On 3 October 2015, Pipinis terminated his contract with Kalloni by mutual consent.

Honours
APOEL
Cypriot First Division: 2013–14
Cypriot Cup: 2013–14

References

External links
APOEL official profile

Profile at UEFA.com
Guardian's Stats Centre
Profile at epae.org

1984 births
Living people
A.P.O. Akratitos Ano Liosia players
Veria F.C. players
Panserraikos F.C. players
Thrasyvoulos F.C. players
Asteras Tripolis F.C. players
APOEL FC players
Super League Greece players
Cypriot First Division players
Greek expatriate footballers
Expatriate footballers in Cyprus
Greek expatriate sportspeople in Cyprus
Association football defenders
Footballers from Athens
Greek footballers